
Gmina Orla  is a rural gmina in Bielsk County, Podlaskie Voivodeship. It is located in north-eastern Poland.

It is one of five Polish/Belarusian bilingual Gmina in Podlaskie Voivodeship regulated by the Act of 6 January 2005 on National and Ethnic Minorities and on the Regional Languages, which permits certain gminas with significant linguistic minorities to introduce a second, auxiliary language to be used in official contexts alongside Polish.

Geography
Gmina Orla is located in the geographical region of Europe known as the Wysoczyzny Podlasko–Białoruskie (English: Podlaskie and Belarus Plateau) and the mezoregion known as the Równina Bielska (English: Bielska Plain).

The Orlanka River, a tributary of the Narew River, passes through Gmina Orla.

Location
It is located approximately: 
  northeast of Warsaw, the capital of Poland
  south of Białystok, the capital of the Podlaskie Voivodeship
  southeast of Bielsk Podlaski, the seat of Bielsk County

Climate
The region has a continental climate which is characterized by high temperatures during summer and long and frosty winters. The average amount of rainfall during the year exceeds .

Demographics
Detailed data as of 31 December 2007:

Municipal government

Its seat is the village of Orla.

Executive branch
The chief executive of the government is the Mayor (Polish: Wójt).

Legislative branch
The legislative portion of the government is the City Council (Polish: Rada) comprising the President (Polish: Przewodniczący), the Vice-President (Polish: Wiceprzewodniczący) and thirteen councilors.

Villages
The following villages are contained within the gmina:

Czechy Zabłotne, Dydule, Gredele, Gregorowce, Koszele, Koszki, Krywiatycze,
Malinniki, Malinniki-Kolonia, Mikłasze, Antonowo-Kolonia, Moskiewce, Oleksze,
Orla, Paszkowszczyzna, Pawlinowo, Reduty, Spiczki,
Szczyty-Dzięciołowo, Szczyty-Nowodwory, Szernie, Topczykały, Wólka, Wólka Wygonowska

Neighbouring political subdivisions
Gmina Orla is bordered by the gminas of Bielsk Podlaski, Boćki, Czyże, Dubicze Cerkiewne and Kleszczele

References 

Orla
Bielsk County
Bilingual communes in Poland